Seekonk Speedway is a family entertainment venue that features racing of all kinds on a semi-banked 1/3 mile asphalt-paved oval, located on U.S. Route 6 in Seekonk, Massachusetts.

The track holds the distinction of being the longest continually operated family-owned race track in the United States, under the guidance of the Venditti family since it opened on May 30, 1946. The track is sanctioned by NASCAR under the Whelen All-American Series. It is also the widest track in New England at 72 feet. The track's all-time winningest drivers include George Summers and "Radical" Rick Martin of Westport, Massachusetts. Typically starting on the first Sunday of May, Seekonk Speedway is host to short track racing every Saturday night, depending on the weather. On Friday nights, Seekonk Speedway is open for lower-budget competition,  to drivers of varying skills. The facility has seating all around, allowing patrons to see the whole track from any seat. Optional pit passes are available for sale which allow patrons to enter the paddock area to meet the drivers and see their cars.

History

Opened in 1946, Seekonk Speedway has hosted stock car racing from its inception. Construction of the track was started by Dominic Anthony Venditti in 1945, following the post-war racing boom. The track was built with midgets in mind, as a 1/4 mile dirt oval. Along with midgets, the track branched out to  modifieds as the staple of racing for nearly twenty years. Venditti had his own vision for the future of auto racing in the United States, and he used his track to promote that vision. In 1980, the track was expanded to a 1/3 mile oval, and paved with asphalt. Midgets and modifieds dominated racing at Seekonk Speedway, until the predecessors to the late models were introduced. The track has not only hosted stock car racing, however. The track has been flooded at least once for boat races to take place within its walls.

Modifieds and midgets were a track staple until 1987, when they were completely phased out of weekly racing. Along with the modifieds were a division that lasted from 1982 to 1987, called the "mini modifieds". Venditti had introduced the division formerly known as the "all-pro division" after a visit to the mid-west, where he received inspiration for a series similar to modern-day super late models, with the intent of replacing the modifieds. For 1978 only, the all-pro division raced with the cadet division (Now known as late models), with a flag on the trunks of the all-pro division cars to differentiate them. The all-pro division became its own division in 1979, and had their name changed to "pro stocks" mid-season. In 1984, the pro stocks replaced the modifieds as the headlining division at Seekonk Speedway. The track claims to have created the division known universally as "super late models", but the claim is widely disputed. Preceding the pro stocks, however, are the track's late models, which have been racing at the track since 1960. The late models were introduced to the speedway in 1960 under the name of the "charger class". The charger class was eventually renamed the "cadet division", also known as the "late model cadets". In 1978, the cadet division was renamed again, to  "late models", but the name was changed back to "cadet division" the following year. For 1980 to 1989 the name had once again been changed, this time back to "charger class". In 1990 the charger class had another name change, this time being named the "late model sportsmen". This name was used until 2003, when sportsman was dropped, leaving the name as "late models". In 2010, the late models had their rules changed so that they would conform to American Canadian Tour late model rules. This allows Seekonk late model drivers to travel to any ACT race they want and race, and also allows any ACT competitor to travel to Seekonk and race.

Street stock racing at Seekonk Speedway was introduced in 1971, for one season. They would later return to the track from 1974 through 1980, taking yet another hiatus at the end of the 1980 racing season. In 1985 however, the street stocks were brought back to Seekonk, and have been racing weekly ever since. The street stock division was introduced as a cheap way to get into racing. The cars ran stock chassis from American made cars, keeping the cost of racing down for its competitors. At the end of the 2016 racing season, the street stocks had their name changed to the sportsmen, per request of the division's new sponsorship. In 1995, Seekonk Speedway introduced a division named the sport trucks. The trucks were introduced as a secondary introduction division to Saturday night racing at the track, the other division being the sportsmen. The current trucks at the track are similar in appearance to Camping World Truck Series trucks, but are down-scaled and far less powerful.

Saturday Night NASCAR

Racing
Saturday night starting at 6PM EST, Seekonk Speedway hosts weekly Saturday Night NASCAR racing under the banner of the Whelen All-American Series, allowing its weekly competitors to fight point battles on the national scale against tracks from all corners of the country. Phil's Propane has signed aboard to sponsor 12 races per year, three per division, in what is called the Phil's Propane Triple Crown Series. Victory lane is sponsored by Everett's Auto Parts, who also sponsor the late model division at the track. Caution flags do not count towards the race total at Seekonk Speedway, except during a touring race in which the series dictates caution laps to count towards the race total.

Racing is split into heat races and feature races. Sport trucks, sportsmen, and late models run 10 lap heat races, while the pro stocks run 12 lap heat races. The top five finishers in each heat race receive points, 5 for first, 4 for second, etc. Sport trucks and sportsmen run 25 lap feature races, and during the Triple Crown Series races run 35 lap feature races. Late models run 30 lap feature races, and during the Triple Crown Series races run 50 lap feature races. Pro stocks run 40 lap feature races, and during the Triple Crown Series races run 65 lap feature races, except for the first Triple Crown race every year, which is 75 laps in memorial to Brad Scott.

NASCAR divisions

Division 1

Division 1 of NASCAR Whelen All-American Series racing at Seekonk Speedway is the pro stocks, also known as super late models at many other tracks. The pro stocks at Seekonk Speedway run either a tube frame chassis or straight rail chassis on 10-inch American Racer racing slicks. The engines are 358 cubic inch crate engines sold by General Motors and Ford Motor Company, generating 400-450 horsepower. Many different body styles of cars are allowed to compete at the track, including (Chevy) Camaro and Impala, (Ford) Mustang and Fusion, (Dodge) Charger and Challenger, (Oldsmobile) Cutlass, (Pontiac) Grand Prix, and (Toyota) Camry. All bodies are made of fiberglass. Use of a General Motors crate engine allows a minimum weight of 2,775 pounds, use of a Ford crate engine allows a minimum weight of 2,800 pounds, and use of an open engine (one built by the competitor's team) allows a minimum weight of 2,825 pounds. A maximum of 56% left side weight is enforced with all tube frame chassis cars, while straight rail chassis cars are allowed only 55%. All weights are measured with driver.

Before every pro stock race, "Stranglehold" by Ted Nugent is played over the loudspeakers.

Division 2

Division 2 of NASCAR Whelen All-American Series racing at Seekonk Speedway is the late models. The late models at Seekonk Speedway run with rules that are nearly identical to the late model rules set by ACT. The late models run a tube frame chassis on 8-inch American Racer racing slicks. The engines are 358 cubic inch crate engines sold by General Motors and Ford Motor Company, generating 350-370 horsepower. Many different body styles of cars are allowed to compete, including (Chevrolet) Monte Carlo and Impala, (Dodge) Charger, (Pontiac) Grand Prix, (Ford) Taurus, and (Toyota) Camry. All bodies are made of fiberglass, generally with steel quarter panels. The minimum weight of all cars is 2,775 pounds including driver, with a maximum of 57% left side weight.

Before every late model race, "Fuel" by Metallica is played over the loudspeakers.

Division 3

Division 3 of NASCAR Whelen All-American Series racing at Seekonk Speedway is the sportsmen. The sportsmen at Seekonk Speedway run any stock American-made chassis made from 1970 to the late 1980s on 7-inch American Racer treaded racing slicks. The engines are 358 cubic inch General Motors and Ford engines and 366 cubic inch Chrysler engines, with the option of running a crate engine, generating 300-350 horsepower. There is a large variety of car body styles allowed to compete, with any car body made in America from 1970 to 1988 allowed. All bodies are required to be made of aluminum or steel. Weight rules are set only on the right side of the cars, with a minimum ride side weight of 1,400 pounds including driver.

Before every sportsman race, "Flirtin' with Disaster" by Molly Hatchet is played over the loudspeakers.

Division 4

Division 4 of NASCAR Whelen All-American Series racing at Seekonk Speedway is the sport trucks. Sport trucks at Seekonk Speedway run 25-lap races. The sport trucks at Seekonk Speedway run a stock chassis from the options of Ford Ranger, Chevrolet S-10, GMC Sonoma, Nissan Frontier, and Toyota Tacoma on 7-inch Hoosier treaded racing slicks. The trucks at Seekonk Speedway have the option of running a four-cylinder or eight-cylinder engine. Four-cylinder engines are limited to 2,300 cubic centimeters (Ford), 2,400 cubic centimeters (Toyota and Nissan) and 2,500 cubic centimeters (Chevrolet). Eight-cylinder engines have the option of running a General Motors crate engine, or running a Chevrolet 305, Ford 302, or Dodge 318 engine. All bodies are required to be made of steel sheet metal. Twenty-three hundred CC engine trucks have a minimum weight of 2,400 pounds, 2,400 CC engines 2,450 pounds, 2,500 CC engines 2,550 pounds, and all V8 trucks have a minimum weight of 2,850 pounds. All weights are measured with driver, with a maximum left side weight for four-cylinder engines being 55% and eight-cylinder engines being 56%.

Before every sport truck race, "Wild Side" by Mötley Crüe is played over the loudspeakers.

Open Wheel Wednesday

Since 2005, Seekonk has featured an exclusively open-wheel program on one Wednesday of the summer. The event features racing from the NEMA lights and midgets, as well as the 100 lap $10,000 to win Tri Track Modified Series race. The two NEMA races are the most prestigious races for each series, as Open Wheel Wednesday headlines as the Boston Louie Memorial for NEMA.

Modifieds
Modified racing during Open Wheel Wednesday takes stage with 4+ 12 lap heat races, with usually the top four or five drivers guaranteed entrance to the 100 lap race. Drivers who do not qualify for the race run 12 lap consolation races, with the top 3 or 4 in each race moving on to the B-Main. The B-Main race is a 25 lap race, with the winner either taking a $1,000 prize or taking the last starting position in the 100 lap race. The rule book for the Tri Track Modified Series is similar to the NASCAR Whelen Modified Tour and Valenti Modified Racing Series modifieds, allowing competitors from both series participate in the Tri Track races with minimal modifications. The winner of the 100 lap modified race takes home the grand prize of $10,000, and positions 16-26 taking home a prize of $800. Past winners include Doug Coby and Matt Hirschman.

NEMA Lights and Midgets

NEMA racing at Seekonk for the Boston Louie Memorial takes stage with 2+ 10 lap heat races. All drivers who qualify are eligible for their division's race (NEMA Light or Midget). There are a wide variety of engines usable in NEMA competition, ranging from 140 CI DOHC inline 4 engines to 195 CI push rod Mopar inline 4 engines.

Fast Friday Series

Racing
Every Friday during the racing season at Seekonk, the track opens its gates to lower budget racing aimed at kids and drivers who are looking to gain experience to move into the Saturday night action at the track. Phil's Propane also sponsors three races per year for each division in the Phil's Propane Triple Crown series. Both Seekonk Youth Racing Association races are 20 laps, sport 4 races are 25 laps, legend races are 25 laps, and pure stock races are 25 laps. The track's spectator drag series also visits during Fast Friday, but not weekly.

Fast Friday divisions

SYRA 600+750
Featuring scaled-down NEXTEL cup bodies run by Honda engines, this is the absolute beginner class for kids aiming to race at Seekonk Speedway. The main difference between the 600 and 750 classes are the restrictor plates, with 750 allowing more power. The 600 class is mainly for kids aged 10–14, and the 750 class is mainly for kids aged 14–18, or younger kids who have more driving experience. Both series mandate a maximum of 55% left side weight, with the minimum weight including driver for the 600 class being 680 pounds and the 750 class being 700 pounds. The SYRA division is going to be phased out of Friday racing at Seekonk, being replaced entirely by bandoleros by 2018. For the 2017 racing season, the 750 division is being replaced by bandoleros.

Sport 4s

The Sport 4s at Seekonk Speedway are nearly stock front wheel drive cars with four cylinder engines, with all modifications only being for safety. This series is used as a place to learn racing mainly. Vehicles must remain stock in mechanical terms, allowing no competitor to give his or her car an advantage over the field. Any front wheel drive and four cylinder car made from 1980 to 2004 is eligible for competition in the sport fours, with some exceptions.

Legends
The Legends at Seekonk Speedway are run under INEX sanctioning, allowing Seekonk competitors to travel to any other INEX Legend race and compete, and allowing any other INEX Legend competitor to come to Seekonk and compete. In 2012, the Legends was added in the Fast Friday lineup. In 2013 Nicks Pit Stop jumped on board as the title sponsor for the legend cars. The Legends run sealed 1250cc Yamaha engines generating about 132 HP. The cars themselves weigh 1,300 pounds including driver and fluids, and run on specifically marked Federal Tires as mandated by INEX rules. The cars have a full tube frame with adjustable coil over springs.

Pure Stocks

Similar to the sport fours, the pure stocks are, as the name implies, pure stock cars. The pure stocks run stock V8 American rear wheel drive cars, with the only modifications allowed for safety. Allowed cars are American cars made from 1970 through 1992, hardtops only, and cars that have t-tops must be sealed off and braced. No weight is allowed to be added to any car, except for weight added for conversion to a race car through safety devices. Mustangs and two-seat cars are not allowed for competition. Stock transmissions only are allowed. The cars run on steel 7 inch wheels, and any street legal 65 series tires. All tires must be the same.

Thrill Shows
On select Sundays throughout the year, Seekonk Speedway hosts thrill shows to celebrate holidays such as Memorial Day. These events generally include racing from the track's spectator drag series, featuring street-legal vehicles in one-lap drag races, enduro cars, enduro trucks, and occasionally monster trucks. In recent years, the track hosted semiannual demolition derbies, featuring some of the largest such events in the world, with up to 200 cars competing simultaneously on the track. Seekonk remains known for its unique setup for figure-8 racing, its 50-lap enduros with up to 100 cars, as well as occasional backwards races, trailer races, and enduro drags, among other thrill-show events that have regularly drawn crowds of 15,000 fans, particular on the 4th of July and Labor Day.

Wall of Fame

Notable races

Deaths
There have been three deaths at Seekonk Speedway, all taking place in 1947 in a span of three months. The track was closed for the remainder of the season following the death of Frank Facenda.

Track Champions

Notable alumni 
 Ron Bouchard (former competitor)
 Ken Bouchard (former competitor)
 Richie Evans (former competitor)
 Bugs Stevens (former competitor)
 Dale Shaw (former competitor)
 Reggie Ruggiero (former competitor)
 Allen Bestwick (former track announcer)

References

 The History of America's Speedways: Past and Present by Allan Brown

External links

Official website
Official 2017 schedule
Seekonk Speedway on NASCAR Hometracks
Seekonk Speedway archive at Racing-Reference
Official Youtube channel

Motorsport venues in Massachusetts
1946 establishments in Massachusetts
Seekonk, Massachusetts
Buildings and structures in Bristol County, Massachusetts
Tourist attractions in Bristol County, Massachusetts
NASCAR tracks